Erythroneura reflecta is a species of leafhopper found in the Eastern United States. It is most common in Illinois and Ohio. They can be found on Vitis riparia (river bank grape), other wild grapes, fruit trees in the genus Prunus, as well as trees and shrubs in the genus Aesculus. Some are mostly white, with a few dull colors, but some can be yellow, orange, blue, brown, and red.

References 

Hemiptera of North America
Insects described in 1924
Erythroneurini